Trnovany is a municipality and village in Litoměřice District in the Ústí nad Labem Region of the Czech Republic. It has about 400 inhabitants.

Administrative parts
The village of Podviní is an administrative part of Trnovany.

References

Villages in Litoměřice District